Spießbach may refer to:

 Spießbach (Nidder), a river of Hesse, Germany, tributary of the Nidder
 Spießbach (Sauer), a river of Rhineland-Palatinate, Germany, tributary of the Sauer